Gateway is a fictional superhero appearing in American comic books published by Marvel Comics. The character has been depicted as an Australian mutant with the ability to teleport objects and people from one location to another. He is considered an unofficial member of the X-Men.

Publication history

Gateway first appeared in The Uncanny X-Men #229 (May 1988), and was created by Chris Claremont and Marc Silvestri.

Fictional character biography
Much of Gateway's past remains a mystery to this day, including where exactly he was born and even his name. He is an Aboriginal Australian man who appears to have grown up in the Outback.

He serves the criminal group the Reavers in repayment for an undisclosed favor they did him. As extra assurance of his loyalty, they threaten to destroy an Aboriginal holy place if he betrays them. They call him "Gateway" in reference to his ability to create gateways between two points in space. Some time later, the X-Men appear in the Outback and attack the Reavers' headquarters. Though Gateway helps the Reavers Skullbuster, Bonebreaker, and Pretty Boy escape, the X-Men realize he is not a Reaver.

The X-Men take up residence in the Reavers' former hideout, and Gateway begins voluntarily using his powers to assist them. Initially, since he seems unable or unwilling to speak, Psylocke uses her telepathic powers to communicate to Gateway where the X-Men wish to go. However, they soon realize he always knows their desired destination without being told. He also used the Dreamtime to observe the start of the corruption of the X-Men's ally, Madelyne Pryor, by Limbo demons, and choose not to intervene nor alert any of the X-Men to the growing danger in their backyard just because that was not his purpose in the scheme of things. 

When Gateway teleported the female X-Men to the Hollywood Mall in Los Angeles, their unusual arrival was noticed by Jubilee, an orphaned teenage mallrat, who happened to be a mutant herself. Admiring the four beautiful ladies, Jubilee secretly followed them the entire day and was eventually rescued by them from a bunch of mutant hunters. When Gateway transported the X-women back to Australia, he deliberately left his portal open longer than necessary. Jubilee saw this and jumped through after them, finding herself welcomed by Gateway. He then pointed her to a secret hide-out underneath the Reavers’ base and for some time Jubilee lived right under the X-Men's noses without them noticing.

Shortly thereafter, the Reavers – now led by Donald Pierce – returned to reclaim their base. They made their move when the X-Men were away on a mission, but Gateway managed to contact Psylocke nonetheless. Through the Dreamtime, Gateway sent the telepathic X-Man a precognitive vision, alerting her of the cruel fate the Reavers had in store for them. Psylocke took the warning seriously and, by the time Gateway teleported the X-Men back to the Outback, she convinced the other X-Men to step through the Siege Perilous, a magical crystal portal that was to send them to a new life. Though robbed of their revenge, the Reavers still captured the unsuspecting Wolverine when he returned from a short leave of absence a few days later. They tortured him for days, with Gateway unable to help him, as he was once again forced to obey the Reavers. However, Wolverine managed to escape with the help of Jubilee, revealing in the process that he deliberately arranged for Jubilee to be around for this very purpose.

More recently, he appears at the Xavier Institute in Massachusetts, where Generation X is training, with a young girl. When he encounters Banshee, he simply speaks the word, "Penance", which is assumed to be the girl's name. Gateway would continue to appear sporadically around Generation X for some time, often in the presence of the fused St. Croix twins Nicole and Claudette, with whom he apparently had a teacher-student relationship.

Gateway appears briefly to Storm's X-Treme X-Men team, shortly after the death of Psylocke, and reveals that he is the ancestor of Bishop and Shard.

He is one of the mutants to have retained his powers after the M-Day.

It is revealed to Iceman and Cannonball that Gateway was one of the targeted mutants the Marauders were killing, along with Cable, Vargas and The Witness due to his powers giving him the ability to see into the future. The Marauders are later seen reporting to Mister Sinister to have killed Gateway, the Witness and Vargas. Gateway survives the assassination attempt and becomes the teacher of Eden Fesi, a young man with the power to manipulate reality.

In Uncanny X-Force #27, Fantomex is murdered by Skinless Man and this severs the connection between him and Ultimaton, the guardian Weapon XV who watched over The World and helped raise Evan. Ultimaton returns to his basic sentinel programming to kill all mutants and snaps Gateway's neck before exploding into a nuclear inferno, destroying Cavern X. Psylocke is able to use her telepathic powers to allow Gateway to create one last portal before dying and save the X-Force.

Gateway is seen as one of the many resurrected mutants now residing on the island nation of Krakoa.

Powers and abilities

Gateway is a mutant with teleportation and psychic abilities.

Gateway creates wormholes which allow travel through space, time and dimensions. He opens these gateways by whirling his bullroarer over his head. The gateways can be used for both observation and transport. No limits have been shown to Gateway's teleportational range or the mass he can transport. He has, for example, transported the X-Men from Australia to the United States and back using his powers, as well as transporting them trans-dimensionally to another Earth. He also opened up gateways to the past.

Gateway is additionally able to enter people's dreams. There he can directly interact with the elements of the dream, and even pull other people into the dream.

Gateway also possesses psionic abilities that allow him to communicate with telepaths. Gateway once spoke to the telepathic Generation X member Chamber psionically, as well as regularly communicating psionically with the St. Croix twins, then disguised as their older sister M.

It has also been implied that he possesses total recall or eidetic memory, as it was revealed in the alternate timeline of the Age of Apocalypse that his time-space manipulating powers allow him to be virtually omniscient, as he is described as "the repository of the knowledge of humanity, the living index of every hard earned scrap of information gleaned in our ascent from mindless savagery".

Other versions

Age of Apocalypse
In the Age of Apocalypse, Gateway spends most of his time on Wundagore Mountain, trying to physically absorb any and all knowledge in audio-visual format from hundreds of televisions and computers using his powers to slow time and warp space before the forces of Apocalypse destroy everything. Weapon X travels to Gateway's home to recruit him in the effort to deliver a crushing blow to Apocalypse's North American forces. Gateway, who is very talkative in this reality, agrees to listen after his bodyguard, Carol Danvers, sacrifices herself in a battle against Donald Pierce. Gateway finally agrees to lead the attack force when he is confronted with the holographic image of a dying sixteen-year-old victim of one of Apocalypse's Infinites. He was later captured and imprisoned in the mysterious floating city known only as The Sky. Gateway was eventually rescued by the combined efforts of the Amazing X-Men and the Uncanny X-Force team but is later reported by the AoA version of William Stryker to have been killed in action.

Civil War: House of M
In the House of M universe, Gateway is briefly seen helping Magneto and his followers overthrow Genosha's current rulers by teleporting his forces to the country.

In other media

Video games
 Gateway has a small role in the game X-Men Legends. The Brotherhood of Mutants were forcing Gateway to make a portal to the equator so they make it to the teleporter to Magneto's lair. Gateway then helped the X-Men chase after the Brotherhood.
 Gateway makes an appearance in Marvel Heroes. He appears at the Xavier Institute, allowing the player to replay former Chapters of the game.
 Gateway appears at the end of each level in X-Men: The Ravages of Apocalypse to transport the player to the next.

References

External links
 Gateway at Marvel.com

Australian superheroes
Fictional characters with precognition
Fictional characters with dimensional travel abilities
Fictional characters with dream manipulation abilities
Fictional hermits
Marvel Comics characters who can teleport
Marvel Comics mutants
Marvel Comics superheroes
Marvel Comics telepaths
Fictional indigenous people of Australia
Characters created by Chris Claremont